The following articles contain lists of motorways and highways of Pakistan:

 Motorways of Pakistan
 National Highways of Pakistan

L